The 2014 St Helens R.F.C. season is the club's 140th in its history; its 119th in rugby league. The Saints will be looking to end a 6-year silverware drought this season by competing for the Super League XIX title as well as the 113th edition of the Challenge Cup. This season marks Australian Nathan Brown's second season as head coach of the club, continuing from his first season in 2013 which ended in a 5th-place finish and an early playoff exit courtesy of an 11–10 defeat at Leeds Rhinos. They began their season by taking on last seasons runner-up Warrington Wolves at the Halliwell Jones Stadium, which ended in an 8–38 win for Saints. This win sent Saints on a win streak that lasted for eight Super League games before being defeated on 18 April 2014 by arch-rivals Wigan Warriors at Langtree Park in the annual Good Friday derby match. Easter was a period to forget for the Saints as they were beaten by Widnes Vikings for their second league defeat in a row, following the Good Friday defeat to bitter rivals Wigan, and then by Leeds Rhinos in Round 5 of the Challenge Cup meaning the Saints will miss out on the trophy for a sixth year. The Saints bounced back however on 1 May with a 48–18 win over the London Broncos. Saints suffered another Magic Weekend to the Warrington Wolves on 18 May with the game ending 41–24 to the Wolves. Results picked up after the Magic Weekend with two straight wins at home against Huddersfield & Salford however the Saints then traveled to Perpignan where they suffered a humiliating 42–0 loss to the Catalans Dragons. Once again, the Saints bounced back with an impressive win over Castleford Tigers at Langtree Park and with another outstanding performance in a pulsating game at the DW Stadium against arch-rivals Wigan Warriors that ended 12–16 in favour of the Saints; the win avenging the Good Friday defeat at Langtree Park. Following this win, Saints suffered a shock 40–10 defeat to Hull Kingston Rovers but bounced back with three straight wins before losing to Hull KR's cross-town rivals, Hull FC, 19–12. However, a 40–16 win over Wakefield Trinity Wildcats & an extremely tight 12–13 win over Leeds Rhinos at Headingley put the Saints in a position where a win against Warrington on 4 September would hand them their first League Leaders' Shield since the 2008 season; with Castleford Tigers being the only other team in contention for the top spot. Despite losing their last two games of the regular season, Saints acquired the League Leaders' Shield following Castleford's failure to beat Catalans Dragons in their last game of the season; meaning that the Saints took their first piece of silverware since 2008. The unlikely success of the 2014 season culminated in a 14–6 win over arch-rivals Wigan Warriors in the 2014 Super League Grand Final at Old Trafford making Saints the Super League champions for the first time since 2006 in an extremely lively, well-fought contest that saw Wigan player Ben Flower sent off for a sucker punch on a defenceless Lance Hohaia in the 2nd minute of the game.

2014 transfers

Players In

Players Out

2014 squad
* Announced on 15 November 2013:

Other staff

Technical staff

Boardroom staff

Pre Season

Saints began their pre-season by taking on Batley Bulldogs in January 2014; taking a 20–0 victory at home. Following this victory, Saints then took on bitter rivals Wigan Warriors in a 'friendly game', again at Langtree Park, for James Roby's testimonial match, sinking to a disappointing 16–28 defeat. They bounced back however for their last pre-season game before the season began with a 6–62 win away at Rochdale Hornets with a St Helens Select XIII team.

Super League XIX Fixtures/Results/Table

Super League XIX – Play-Off Series

Even without key players Luke Walsh, Jon Wilkin & Jonny Lomax for the majority of the second half of the season, Saints managed to battle through the play-offs to reach an unprecedented 10th Grand Final. Even though they also lost Lance Hohaia in the second minute of the game via a disgraceful punch from Ben Flower, Saints overcame the solid defence of Wigans remaining 12 men to claim their 5th Super League title.

2014 Tetley's Challenge Cup Fixtures\Results

References

St Helens R.F.C. seasons
St Helens RLFC season